Richard Lewis is the chief constable of Dyfed-Powys Police.

Career 
Richard Lewis was born in Carmarthenshire in West Wales. Prior to being chief constable for Dyfed-Powys he served as the chief constable of Cleveland Police from April 2019. He started his policing career with Dyfed–Powys Police in 2000, where he worked in Uniform and CID. Lewis held every rank from constable to deputy dhief constable whilst at Dyfed Powys Police, prior to becoming chief constable at Cleveland.

Heddlu Cymru/Wales Police 
Chief Constable Richard Lewis has suggested an all-Wales police force "Heddlu Cymru/Wales Police" and stated, "(If) the Americans can put a man on the moon in eight years, I think we can unify four police services. Doing away with those borders means we can provide a more effective service."

Honours

References

 

 
 

Living people
Year of birth missing (living people)
Welsh police officers
Dyfed-Powys Police officers
British Chief Constables